The Ichthyosauriformes are a group of marine reptiles, belonging to the Ichthyosauromorpha, that lived during the Mesozoic.

The stem clade Ichthyosauriformes was in 2014 defined by Ryosuke Motani and colleagues as the group consisting of all ichthyosauromorphs that are more closely related to Ichthyosaurus communis than to Hupehsuchus nanchangensis. Their synapomorphies include the possession of a long nasal bone, stretching to the front beyond the nostril; large scleral rings, filling the eye sockets; a narrow snout in top view; and converging digits with little space between them.

The Ichthyosauriformes probably split off in the Early Triassic, about 250 million years ago; the last known forms lived in the middle Cretaceous. A basal ichthyosauriform is Cartorhynchus; more derived species are part of the Ichthyopterygia which again include the Ichthyosauria.

Literature
Motani, R., Jiang, D.-Y., Chen, G.-B., Tintori, A., Rieppel, O., Ji, C., and Huang J.-D., 2014, "A basal ichthyosauriform with a short snout from the Lower Triassic of China", Nature. doi:10.1038/nature13866

Mesozoic reptiles
Olenekian first appearances
Turonian extinctions
Ichthyosauromorphs